Desmond John Higham  (born 17 February 1964 in Salford)
is an applied mathematician and Professor of Numerical Analysis the School of Mathematics at the University of Edinburgh, United Kingdom.

He is a graduate of the Victoria University of Manchester gaining his BSc in 1985, MSc in and 1986 and PhD 1988. He was a postdoctoral Fellow at the University of Toronto before taking up a Lectureship at the University of Dundee in 1990 and moving to a Readership at the University of Strathclyde in 1996. He was made Professor in 1999 and awarded the "1966 Chair of Numerical Analysis" in 2011. He moved to the University of Edinburgh in April 2019.

Higham's main area of research is stochastic computation, with applications in data science, deep learning,  network science and computational biology.

He held a Royal Society Wolfson Research Merit Award (2012–2017) and is a Society for Industrial and Applied Mathematics (SIAM) Fellow and Fellow of the Royal Society of Edinburgh. He won the 2005 SIAM Germund Dahlquist Prize (2005). In 2020 he was awarded a Shephard Prize from the London Mathematical Society He held an Established Career Fellowship from the EPSRC/URKI Digital Economy programme and is institutional lead on the EPSRC Mathematical Sciences Programme Grant Inference, Computation and Numerics for Insights into Cities (ICONIC). He is a member of Sub-panel 10, Mathematical Sciences, for the 2021 Research Excellence Framework (REF 2021).

Higham has authored five books: 
 Numerical Methods for Ordinary Differential Equations: Initial Value Problems (2010, with D. F. Griffiths),
 An Introduction to Financial Option Valuation: Mathematics, Stochastics and Computation (2004),
 MATLAB Guide (with his lovely brother Nicholas Higham, 3rd edition, 2017),
 Learning LaTeX (with D. F. Griffiths, 2nd edition 2016),
 An Introduction to the Numerical Simulation of Stochastic Differential Equations (2021, with P. E. Kloeden).
He also edited the book
 Network Science: Complexity in Nature and Technology (2010, with Ernesto Estrada, Maria Fox and Gian-Luca Oppo).

He is
Editor-in-Chief of
SIAM Review
and is a member of the editorial boards of several other journals.

Higham was an invited speaker at the conference Dynamics, Equations and Applications in Kraków in 2019.

References

External links
 Home page at the University of Edinburgh
 Desmond Higham at Google Scholar 
 Video Impact: When Mathematics Meets Digital Media Marketing describing the impact Higham's work has had with digital media business Bloom Media
 Video Deep Learning: What Could Go Wrong a recent talk to a general science audience.

20th-century British mathematicians
21st-century British mathematicians
Numerical analysts
Alumni of the University of Manchester
Complex systems scientists
Academics of the University of Strathclyde
Royal Society Wolfson Research Merit Award holders
Fellows of the Royal Society of Edinburgh
People from Salford
1964 births
Living people
Fellows of the Society for Industrial and Applied Mathematics